Riviera LRT station is an elevated Light Rail Transit (LRT) station in Punggol, Singapore. Serving the east loop of the Punggol LRT line (PGLRT), the station is along Punggol East between the junctions of Punggol Central and Punggol Field. Surrounding landmarks include Punggol Joint Temple and Punggol Promenade Riverside Park.

The LRT station opened on 29 January 2005 together with the east loop stations of the PGLRT. In March 2019, it was announced that the station would interchange with the Punggol branch of the Cross Island MRT line (CRL). The new platforms are expected to be completed by 2032.

History

Punggol LRT line

The station was first constructed as part of the LRT system serving the Punggol area. The contract for the design and construction of the  Punggol LRT system was awarded to a joint venture, comprising Singapore Technologies Industrial Corporation, Mitsubishi Heavy Industries and Mitsubishi Corporation, at S$656 million (US$ million). The station opened on 29 January 2005 together with the stations of the Punggol LRT line (PGLRT) east loop.

On 9 January 2020, a crack was discovered on one of the plinths between the Riviera and Coral Edge stations. One platform was closed early for urgent maintenance, while operations continued as trains ran at the other platform.

Cross Island line interchange
On 10 March 2020, Riviera station was announced to interchange with the Cross Island line (CRL). The  CRL Punggol extension, consisting of four stations between the Pasir Ris and Punggol, was expected to be completed in 2031. However, the restrictions imposed on construction works due to the COVID-19 pandemic has led to delays and the dates were pushed by one year to 2032.

The contract for the design and construction of Riviera CRL Station was awarded to a joint venture between Taisei Corporation and China State Construction Engineering Corporation Limited Singapore Branch on 30 September 2022. Construction will start in 2023 with an expected completion date of 2032.

Details
The station serves the east loop of the PGLRT and is between the Coral Edge and Kadaloor stations. The official station code is PE4. The station will serve the CRL Punggol branch between the Punggol and  stations. Like the rest of the LRT stations, the station has lifts and wider fare gates for wheelchair users and tactile flooring to guide visually impaired commuters through the station.

Named to reflect the seaside theme, the station is located along Punggol East. The station has two entrances to serve various landmarks including Punggol Joint Temple, Punggol NPC and Punggol Promenade Riverside Park.

Notes and references

Footnotes

References

External links

Railway stations in Singapore opened in 2005
Punggol
LRT stations in Punggol
Railway stations in Punggol
Light Rail Transit (Singapore) stations
Mass Rapid Transit (Singapore) stations